Roman Tam Pak-sin (12 February 1945– 18 October 2002), known professionally by his stage name Law Man, was a Hong Kong singer. He is regarded as the "Grand Godfather of Cantopop".

Career
Born in Baise, Guangxi, China, with family roots in Guiping, Guangxi. He moved to Guangzhou (Canton) in 1947 at the age of 2. He later emigrated to Hong Kong in 1962 at the age of 17. After forming a short-lived band known as Roman and the Four Steps and winning a talent contest in Japan, he became a contract singer under studios term at TVB. He briefly switched to Asia Television in the early 1990s.

During the 1990s, he accepted many budding singers as his students. Some of whom that became famous included Shirley Kwan, Joey Yung and Ekin Cheng. He had sung many well-known solos and duets for various TV series including Below the Lion Rock, and the famous 1983 TVB TV series The Legend of the Condor Heroes main theme duet with Jenny Tseng.

Tam was also known for bending and breaking gender norms, with a "flamboyant" on-stage persona. He was the first Hong Kong pop star to perform in drag and was featured in a magazine while posing in the nude. Although the latter was controversial at the time, Tam "'got away with his on-stage flamboyance because of his off-stage discretion' and was accepted 'in mainstream Chinese culture at a time when homosexuality was outlawed'". He never married and maintained a high degree of privacy in his personal life.

Tam officially retired in 1996, but continued to perform occasionally with other artists. 

On 19 October 2002, Tam died in Hong Kong at Queen Mary Hospital from liver cancer at the age of 57. Then-Secretary for Home Affairs Patrick Ho expressed his condolences.

References

External links

Applauding Hong Kong Pop Legend: Roman Tam – About the collection, Hong Kong Memory

1945 births
2002 deaths
Musicians from Guangzhou
Singers from Guangdong
Singers from Guangxi
People from Baise
Deaths from liver cancer
20th-century Hong Kong male singers
Cantopop singers
Hong Kong Mandopop singers
Hong Kong male film actors
Hong Kong male television actors